Pedro Vasconcelos (born October 25, 1974 in Rio de Janeiro) is a Brazilian director and television actor.

Selected filmography
 Império (2014)
 A Teia (2014)
 O Concurso (2013)
 Amor Eterno Amor (2012)
 Escrito nas Estrelas (2010)
 A Marca do Zorro (2009) 
 Paraíso (2009)
 Por Toda Minha Vida  (2008)
 Sete Pecados (2007)
 Amazônia, de Galvez a Chico Mendes (2007)
 Alma Gêmea (2005)
 Linha Direta (“O caso das máscaras de chumbo”, 2004)
 Bambuluá (2000)
 Sítio do Picapau Amarelo (2001-2002)
 D'Artagnan e Os Três Mosqueteiros (1998)
 Malhação (1995)

External links
 

1974 births
Living people
Brazilian film directors
Brazilian male telenovela actors